Khatri (Hindi), is a surname.

Notable people with the surname include:

Abdul Gafur Khatri, Indian Rogan artist
Abdul Kadar Khatri (1961–2019), Indian Bagh printmaker
Atul Khatri, Indian stand-up comedian and YouTube personality
Bhagawati Khatri (born 1972), Nepalese sport shooter at the 2000 Olympics
Bhavna Khatri, Indian television actress
Devaki Nandan Khatri (1861–1913), Indian Hindi novelist
Gaurav Khatri, Indian cricketer
Gul Muhammad Khatri (1919–1979), Pakistani artist
Gulshan Rai Khatri (1944–2020), Indian doctor and public health specialist
Hamed Al-Khatri, Omani sport shooter at the 2016 Olympics
Hira Singh Khatri, Nepalese filmmaker
Indra Bahadur Khatri, Nepalese politician
Jayant Khatri (1909–1968), Gujarati short story author
Kamal Khatri, Nepalese singer
Khalaf Al-Khatri, Omani sport shooter at the 1992 and 1996 Olympics
Krishna Khatri, Nepali woman's footballer
Madhur Khatri, Indian cricketer
Man Prasad Khatri (born 1963), Nepalese politician
Mausam Khatri, Indian freestyle wrestler
Mohammed Rafik Khatri, Indian Bagh printmaker
Mohammed Yusuf Khatri, Indian inventor of Bagh printing
Mukesh Khatri, Indian Greco-Roman wrestler at the 2004 Olympics
Nayan Bahadur Khatri (died 2019), Chief Justice of Nepal
Neeldaman Khatri, Indian politician, leader of Bharatiya Janata Party
Nirmal Khatri, Indian politician and Member of Parliament
Padma Bahadur Khatri (1915–1985), Nepalese army officer, diplomat and Foreign Minister
Phupu Lhamu Khatri (born 1996), Nepalese Olympic judoka
Poonam Khatri, Indian Wushu player, martial artist and athlete
Ravinder Khatri, Indian Greco-Roman wrestler
Sadia Khatri, Pakistani writer, photographer and feminist
Sardar Gulab Singh Khatri, 18th-century Indian Sikh, founder of the Dallewalia Misl state
Shabina Khatri, American journalist in Qatar, co-founder of Doha News
Sulakshana Khatri, Indian film and television actress
Uma Devi Khatri (1923–2003), known professionally as Tun Tun, Indian playback singer and actress-comedienne

Fictional characters:
 Fenisha Khatri, from the British television series Casualty

Indian surnames
Nepali-language surnames